Cha-186 or No. 186 (Japanese: 第百八十六號驅潜特務艇) was a No.1-class auxiliary submarine chaser of the Imperial Japanese Navy that served during World War II and with Japan during the post-war period.

History
Her construction was authorized under the Maru Sen Programme (Ship # 2001–2100). She was laid down on 3 May 1944 as ship 2036 at the Ichikawa Shipyard (jp:市川造船所) in Ujiyamada and launched on 6 July 1944. 

She was completed and commissioned on 4 September 1944, fitted with armaments at the Yokosuka Naval Arsenal, and assigned to the Yokosuka Defense squadron, Yokosuka Defense Force, Yokosuka Naval District and tasked with securing Tokyo Bay. She operated out of Uraga, Kanagawa with patrols to Tateyama, Chiba. On 7 September 1944, she was assigned to the Shimoda, Shizuoka patrol unit. On 4 March 1945, she was assigned to Tateyama guard area. On 15 May 1945, she was assigned to the Tsushima Defense Force, Kanmon Straits Defense Unit. On 5 June 1945, she was assigned to the Shimonoseki Defense Corps. Cha-186 survived the war and was decommissioned on 30 November 1945.

On 1 December 1945, she was enrolled as a minesweeper by the occupation forces, one of 269 Japanese ships that served as a minesweeper under the Allied forces after the war. She conducted minesweeping operations based out of Shimonoseki and later Kure and then Osaka. On 1 August 1947, she was demobilized and on 28 August 1947, she was released to the Ministry of Transportation. 

On 1 May 1948, she was assigned to the Japan Maritime Safety Agency, a sub-agency of the Ministry of Transportation, and designated on 23 August 1948 as patrol vessel Hatsukari (はつかり) (PB-13). On 1 July 1950, she was re-designated as patrol vessel Hatsukari (PS-13). On 1 July 1951, she was re-designated as patrol vessel Hatsukari (PS-131).  She was delisted on 20 November 1956.

References

1944 ships
No.1-class auxiliary submarine chasers
Auxiliary ships of the Imperial Japanese Navy